The Yevpatoria RT-70 radio telescope (P-2500, RT-70) is an RT-70 radio telescope and planetary radar at the Center for Deep Space Communications, Yevpatoria, Crimea. In the scientific literature is often called Evpatoria Planetary Radar (EPR).

History

With its 70-meter antenna diameter, it is among the largest single dish radio telescopes in the world. It has an advantage in comparison with other large radio telescopes in the fact that the complex includes powerful transmitters that allow active space experiments. Powerful electromagnetic beams can be accurately targeted and the signals received can be analyzed. For this reason, the Yevpatoria RT-70 radio telescope is one of only two in the world that are able to transmit messages to extraterrestrial civilizations, i.e. the multiple Cosmic Calls, Teen Age Messages or A Message from Earth (AMFE). Radio telescopes are highly sensitive detectors of signals from outer space.

The radio telescope is depicted on Russia's commemorative 100-ruble banknote of 2015.

Missions 

The telescope has participated in Soviet space program since 1978 for the exploration of deep space:
 Venera 11 and Venera 12
 VLBI Salyut 6 KRT-10 radio observatory — RT-70
 Venera 13, Venera 14, Venera 15, Venera 16
 Vega program
 Astron
 Phobos program
 Granat
 Interball
 Fobos-Grunt (in 2011)
 Spektr-R
In 1999, 2001, 2003, 2008, transmit messages to extraterrestrial civilizations:
 Cosmic Call
 Teen Age Message
 Cosmic Call 2
 A Message From Earth
Radar studies of planets and asteroids. Observatory code 255 (Evpatoria).
 4179 Toutatis
 6489 Golevka (the name Golevka comes from the first few letters of the names of three observatories Goldstone, Evpatoria and Kashima.
 (33342) 1998 WT24
 (101955) 1999 RQ36

See also 
 Goldstone Deep Space Communications Complex

 Galenki RT-70 radio telescope – at the Ussuriysk Astrophysical Observatory
 Suffa RT-70 radio telescope – at the Suffa Radio Observatory
 Complex “Pluton-M” – at Center for Deep Space Communications

References

External links 
 Радиотелескоп РТ-70 (П-2500) 
 National Space Facilities Control and Testing Center, Eupatoria
 3D Maker version

Radio telescopes
Astronomical observatories built in the Soviet Union
Space program of Russia
Space program of the Soviet Union
Soviet and Russian space program locations
Yevpatoria
Buildings and structures in Crimea